is the monorail route of the Osaka Monorail which runs from  in Suita, Osaka Prefecture to Saito-nishi Station.
The line opened in two stages - on 1 October 1998, from Bampaku-kinen-koen Station to Handai-byoin-mae Station, and on 19 March 2007, to Saito-nishi Station, in Ibaraki, about a kilometer from the Osaka University of Foreign Studies in Minoh.

An extension was planned north of Saito-nishi Station, but plans were dropped on 27 January 2017 due to a lack of profitability as the zoning around the proposed extension was switched from residential to industrial.

Stations

External links
Official website
Route Map

References

Monorails in Japan
Osaka University transportation
Railway lines opened in 1998